The Warren County Farmers' Fair Balloon Festival was started in 2001 and takes place during the week of the County Fair in Warren County, New Jersey. The Fair itself was established in 1937 by the Warren County Farmers' Fair Association. The event is a non-profit 501(c)6, agriculture in nature.

The balloon festival was started by pilot Fred Grotenhuis, who has flown hot air balloons since the mid 80's. The festival began with approximately 15 balloons and to date has grown to about 30 balloons. The event features some balloon races, including the typical hare and hound races, in addition to the Bicycle Balloon Race.

There was no festival from 1942 to 1944.

References

External links 

 Warren County Farmers' Fair

Hot air balloon festivals in the United States
Tourist attractions in Warren County, New Jersey
Festivals in New Jersey
Recurring events established in 2001
2001 establishments in New Jersey